The Pumas (known as the Airlink Pumas for sponsorship reasons) are a South African rugby union team that competes in the Premier Division of the Currie Cup and the Northern Section of the Vodacom Cup. The team draws their players from Mpumalanga Province (formerly known as the South Eastern Transvaal) and plays at the Mbombela Stadium in Mbombela, having previously also played at the Puma Stadium in Witbank.

The Pumas are a well supported team throughout Mpumalanga Province, with large fan bases located in Witbank, Middelburg, Ermelo and Mbombela.

History
Formed in 1969 as South Eastern Transvaal, the Pumas are one of the younger unions in the country. The team won the Currie Cup for the first time in 2022.

In 2006, they were coached jointly by Chris Grobler and Danie Gerber, but failed to win any of their 14 matches, finishing last on the log.

They won the Currie Cup First Division (the second tier competition) in 2005 and 2009, both times earning promotion to the Currie Cup Premier Division.

For their 2010 Currie Cup campaign, the Pumas appointed the seasoned Jimmy Stonehouse as coach. Though considered the underdogs of the Currie Cup competition, on 27 August 2010 the Pumas beat current champions the  22–21 at the Mbombela Stadium in Mbombela. They eventually finished 7th.

Honours

The team's major tournament wins include:
 Currie Cup Premier Division: 2022
 Currie Cup First Division: 2005, 2009 and 2013
 Vodacom Cup: 2015
 Rugby Challenge: 2018.

Current squad

The following players were included in the Pumas squad for the 2023 Currie Cup Premier Division:

References

External links
 Official Website
 Pumas statistics on supersport.com

South African rugby union teams
Sport in Mpumalanga
Mbombela